Siv Grava (born 1954), who lives in Elliston, South Australia, is an Australian artist.

Grava won the 1992 Doug Moran National Portrait Prize for Self Portrait.

Collections
Her works are held in the collections of the 
Australian Catholic University (Andamooka triptych), and the Tweed Regional Gallery (Self Portrait).

Exhibitions
Grava's work has been exhibited at the Flinders University Museum of Art (Tough(er) Love: Art From Eyre Peninsula, group).

References

1954 births
Living people
20th-century Australian painters
21st-century Australian painters
20th-century Australian women artists
21st-century Australian women artists
Artists from South Australia
Australian women painters
Australian landscape painters